Hypocysta aroa is a species of butterfly of the family Nymphalidae. It is found in New Guinea.

Subspecies
Hypocysta aroa aroa (Papua New Guinea: Aroa River)
Hypocysta aroa aspis Jordan, 1924 (northern New Guinea: Arfak Mountains)

References

Butterflies described in 1908
Satyrini